An analog board is a circuit board that contains the majority of analog circuitry in certain Apple Macintosh computers. The analog board was one of two circuit boards within many early Macintosh computers, including the Macintosh 128K/512K/Plus, Macintosh SE series, and Macintosh Classic series. The analog board contained several capacitors, a battery compartment, and some other analog circuitry. Some later all-in-one Macintosh computers also included analog boards, with the most recent being the iMac G3 and eMac. In these computers, the analog board functioned as the power supply to other parts within the system, and also functioned to control the CRT display within the computer. The other board was the logic board, which contained all of the computer's digital logic circuitry, such as the processor and memory.

See also 
 Logic board

Macintosh computers
Macintosh internals